Pida, or Pidae or Pidis, was a town of ancient Pontus, inhabited during Roman and Byzantine times. It was in the later province of Pontus Galaticus, on the road leading from Amasia to Neocaesareia.

Its site is located near Akça in Asiatic Turkey.

References

Populated places in ancient Pontus
Former populated places in Turkey
Roman towns and cities in Turkey
Populated places of the Byzantine Empire
History of Tokat Province